Jiong is a once obscure Chinese character meaning a "patterned window". Since 2008, it has become an internet phenomenon and widely used to express embarrassment and gloom, because of the character's resemblance to a sad facial expression.

Original meanings
 Window, according to Xu Shen's 2nd-century dictionary Shuowen Jiezi: “窻牖麗廔闓明” (an open and light window).
 Granary. 米囧 means “put the new rice into a granary”.
 Sacrificial place. Based on Chouli.
 Toponym.

Internet emoticon

The character for jiong is nowadays more widely used on the Internet as an ideographic emoticon representing a range of moods, as it resembles a person's face. It is commonly used to express ideas or feelings such as annoyance, shock, embarrassment, awkwardness, etc.

The use of jiong as an emoticon can be traced to 2005 or earlier; it was referenced on 20 January 2005 in a Chinese-language article on orz. The character is sometimes used in conjunction with orz, OTZ or its other variants to form "囧rz", representing a person on their hands and knees (jiong forming the face, while r and z represent arms and legs respectively) and symbolising despair or failure.

Encoding
Unicode also includes U+518F (冏), which is considered a variant.

References

Bibliography

Emoticons
Chinese characters